Peter Kenneth Murray (born 14 October 1969) is an Australian musician who has had three albums reach number 1 on the Australian (ARIA) charts. Murray has received 17 ARIA nominations throughout his career so far. He has sold over 1.2 million albums in Australia.

Biography

1969–2002: Early life and career beginnings
Peter Kenneth Murray was born in Chinchilla, on 14 October 1969. His mother is Jan and he has a sister. When Murray was 16 the family moved to Brisbane. He attended St Joseph's College, Nudgee, for his final two years of secondary schooling. At the college, Murray showed talent in rugby union, athletics, and swimming. He briefly played for Brisbane club rugby for GPS and Brothers. When he was 18, his father died of a heart attack, Murray was contesting the Australian championships of the 400 meters.

While on the sidelines, Murray started to learn the guitar at age 22. Eventually, he worked up the courage to take his guitar to a barbecue singing songs by Neil Young and Crowded House. However, his main interest was traveling and pursuing a career in sports medicine.

Murray played small gigs around the country with flautist Col McIntyre, eventually putting a band together (including the keyboard player Ben McCarthy, who works with him to this day). In 2002, he released an independent album, The Game, in Brisbane and moved to Melbourne to pursue a musical career.

2003–2004: Feeler

In early 2003, Murray signed a contract with Sony BMG and he entered the studio with producer Paul McKercher and his band (consisting of Ben McCarthy on bass guitar and keyboards, Christian Sargeant on drums, Paul Tyrell on guitar and Col McIntyre on reeds & flute) to make the Feeler album. 

Feeler was released on 21 July 2003 with the title track as the first single. Triple J radio started playing the track with the Nova FM and Triple M networks picking it up. With this support, Feeler entered the ARIA top 50 album charts in 2003. His reputation was building fast and he started selling out shows in smaller venues.

The momentum of the album continued to build with the release of the second single, "Lines", and two ARIA award nominations reaching platinum record status.  "So Beautiful" was widely played on Australian radio, reaching the top ten in 2004. This spurred sales of the album driving it to number one on the Australian album charts in late March 2004 and six times platinum status. By 2008, the album had sold half-a-million copies.

2005–2007: See the Sun

Murray's third studio album, See the Sun,was released in September 2005. The album spawned three official singles, "Better Days", "Opportunity" and "George's Helper", while a video was made for radio single "Class A". Days after its release, Murray performed at the 2005 NRL grand final. See the Sun sold 350,000 copies.

2008–2010:Summer at Eureka

His fourth studio album, Summer at Eureka, was released on 17 May 2008. On 26 May 2008, it entered the charts at number 1 in Australia, his third consecutive chart-topping album. The first single from the album was "You Pick Me Up", which reached number 36 on the Australian charts. The second single from the album, "Saving Grace", was released on 2 August 2008.

2011–2015:Blue Sky Blue

His fifth studio album, Blue Sky Blue, was released in Australia on 2 September 2011 and peaked at number 6 in Australia and was certified gold. In 2012, many of the songs were re-recorded with a number of the songs recorded as duets. This album was titled Blue Sky Blue "The Byron Sessions" and peaked at number 17 in Australia in 2013.

2017–2018: Camacho 

In June 2017, Murray released his seventh studio album Camacho. The album peaked at number 3 in Australia.

2020–2022: The Night and Before I Go
On 26 June 2020, Murray released "Found My Place", his first single since Camacho. It was the lead single from his EP The Night, which was released on 5 March 2021. The EP also featured the singles "If We Never Dance Again" and "Waiting for This Love". On 17 September 2021, Pete released "Hold Me Steady", the first single from the follow up EP, Before I Go, released on 1 April 2022.

2023: Best Of
In February 2023, Murray announced the forthcoming release of Best Of and 2023 Greatest Hits Tour, commencing in July.

Personal life
Murray married Amanda Coutts on 7 October 2006 in Eureka, New South Wales. In July 2009, Murray and Coutts had separated and shared custody of their two children. Coutts worked as a designer and renovated a set of stables into a home.

In 2016 he married his partner of four years Mira Eady.

Discography

 The Game (2001)
 Feeler (2003)
 See the Sun (2005)
 Summer at Eureka (2008) 
 Blue Sky Blue (2011)
 Blue Sky Blue "The Byron Sessions" (2013)
 Camacho (2017)

Awards and nominations

ARIA Music Awards
Murray has been nominated for 17 ARIA Music Awards.

|-
| rowspan="4"| 2003 ||rowspan="2"| Feeler || Breakthrough Artist – Album ||  
|-
| Best Blues & Roots Album ||  
|-
|rowspan="2"| Paul McKercher for Feeler || Producer of the Year ||   
|-
|| Engineer of the Year ||  
|-
| rowspan="7"| 2004 ||Feeler || Highest Selling Album ||  
|-
|rowspan="4"| "So Beautiful" || Best Male Artist ||  
|-
| Single of the Year ||  
|-
| Best Pop Release ||  
|-
| Best Video ||  
|-
| Passing Time || Best Music DVD ||  
|-
| Paul McKercher & Pete Murray for "So Beautiful" || Producer of the Year ||  
|-
| rowspan="2"| 2006 ||rowspan="2"| See the Sun || Highest Selling Album ||  
|-
| Best Male Artist ||  
|-
| rowspan="2"| 2008 || Summer at Eureka || Best Male Artist ||  
|-
| Anthony Lycenko for Summer at Eureka || Engineer of the Year ||  
|-
| 2009 || Chance to Say Goodbye || Best Blues & Roots Album ||  
|-
| 2017 || Camacho || Best Adult Contemporary Album ||

APRA awards
The APRA Awards are several award ceremonies run in Australia by the Australasian Performing Right Association (APRA) to recognise composing and song writing skills, sales and airplay performance by its members annually. The awards have been presented annually since 1982.

|-
| 2005 || "So Beautiful" (Peter Murray) || Most Performed Australian Work || 
|-
| 2006 || "Better Days" (Murray) || Song of the Year || 
|-
| 2007 || "Opportunity" (Murray) || Most Performed Australian Work || 
|-
| 2012 
| "Always a Winner" (Murray, Tom Rothrock) 
| Song of the Year
| 
|-

Queensland Music Awards
The Queensland Music Awards (previously known as Q Song Awards) are annual awards celebrating Queensland, Australia's brightest emerging artists and established legends. They commenced in 2006.

 (wins only)
|-
| 2012
| himself
| The Courier-Mail People's Choice Award Most Popular Male
| 
|-

References

External links
 

1969 births
APRA Award winners
Australian male singers
Australian multi-instrumentalists
Australian songwriters
Living people
People from Brisbane
Sony Music Australia artists